According to WHO's 2016 suicide report, France ranked 48th of the 183 countries listed. France ranked second highest for suicides in Western Europe. France had an overall suicide rate of 12.1 per 100,000 people in 2016. The 2016 suicide rate for French men was 17.9 per 100,000 and 6.5 per 100,000 for women according to WHO's 2016 suicide report. The total suicide rate and the suicide rate for men have declined since 2012 while the suicide rate for women has risen slightly. The rate of suicide in France in 2012 was 12.3 per 100,000 people overall, 19.3 per 100,000 for men and 6 per 100,000 for women.

Suicides at France Telecom captured media attention in 2009, and with some attributing blame on the company's restructuring in the wake of its privatization.

History
The suicide rate in France began increasing between 1975 and 1985, reaching an all time high of 22.5 per 100,000 people in 1985. It began decreasing since. The suicide rate among men in France in 1985 was 33.1 per 100,000.

References

Further reading